Brenthia elongata is a moth of the family Choreutidae. It is known from Puerto Rico and the Virgin Islands.

The length of the forewings is about 4 mm for males and 3.5-3.7 mm for females.

The larvae possibly feed on Paullinia pinnata.

References

Brenthia